Lena Richard (September 9, 1892 or 1893 - November 27, 1950) was a chef, cookbook author, restaurateur, frozen food entrepreneur, and television host from New Orleans, Louisiana. In 1949, Richard became the first Black woman to host her own television cooking show. Her show aired from October 1949 - November 1950 on local television station WDSU.

Richard initially received her culinary education locally in New Orleans, and later in Boston where she attended the school founded by Fannie Farmer. She graduated in 1918 and returned to New Orleans where a few years later she opened her own catering business and several restaurants. She opened a cooking school in 1937 in New Orleans specifically for Black students. In 1939, Richard self-published Lena's Richard's Cook Book. The cookbook made her the first Black author to feature New Orleans Creole cuisine.

Early life
Lena Richard (née Paul) was born in New Roads, Louisiana on September 9, 1892, to Françoise Laurent and Jean-Pierre Paul. She was baptized as Marie Aurina Paul in the Catholic Church on October 9, 1892, and was one of six children. At an early age, Richard moved to New Orleans, where her mother and aunt worked as domestic servants for Alice and Nugent Vairin at their home on Esplanade Avenue. Richard helped her mother and aunt in the kitchen after school, and upon her graduation, the Vairins hired her, and later sent her to cooking school in New Orleans and at the Fannie Farmer Cooking School in Boston. Richard graduated from the Fannie Farmer School in 1918, and returned to New Orleans.

Culinary career
Richard began her culinary training working as a domestic worker employed by the Vairin family of New Orleans. Alice and Nugent Vairin would later send Richard to the Fannie Farmer Cooking School in Boston. After graduation in 1918, Richard returned to New Orleans and a few years later started a catering business. During the next two decades, she started multiple businesses and also worked as a cook at the Orleans Club, an elite organization for white women.

In 1937, Richard and her daughter, Marie, started a cooking school. As historian Ashley Young Rose writes, "Richard’s school targeted young black men and women. She sought to train them in the culinary sciences so as to give them a chance to make a career for themselves in a city that historically disenfranchised African Americans."

In 1939, Richard self-published Lena Richard’s Cook Book. A year later, Houghton-Mifflin reissued her book with a new title, New Orleans Cook Book.

Richard traveled to promote her book in the New York City, where she sold 700 copies during a one-month trip. She was also featured in both the New York Times and The Times Herald Tribune. Richard was recruited to be the head chef at Bird and Bottle Inn in Garrison, New York, where she worked for 18 months starting in 1940. Richard soon returned to New Orleans and opened Lena's Eatery in November 1941.

She was recruited by Colonial Williamsburg to be the chef at the Travis House, where she cooked for dignitaries and military leaders from 1943 until 1945.

In 1946, Richard started a frozen food business, creating fully cooked packaged dinners that were flown across in the United States. The meals were prepared by Bordelon Fine Foods Company of Metairie.

In 1949, Richard opened her last restaurant, The Gumbo House. It employed most of Richard's family and remained open after her death.

Media career
From 1949 to 1950, Richard hosted a 30-minute cooking television show called Lena Richard's New Orleans Cook Book. The show aired twice weekly and was broadcast on New Orleans' first television station, WDSU. During the program, Richard and her assistant, Marie Matthews, guided their television audience through recipes from Richard's cookbook. Richard and Matthews were the first African-Americans to host a cooking show in an age when few households owned television sets.

Personal life
Richard married Percival Richard in July 29, 1914. They had one daughter, Marie Richard, who graduated from Xavier University with a degree in Home Economics. Marie helped her mother open her cooking school in New Orleans in 1937.

Recognition
In 2020, Richard was one of eight women featured in "The Only One in the Room" display at the Smithsonian National Museum of American History.

Bibliography

 Lena Richard's Cook Book. New Orleans, Rogers Printing Co., 1939. 
 New Orleans Cookbook. Boston, Houghton Mifflin Company., 1940. 
 Louisiana Cookery (1954) 
 New Orleans Cuisine (1969)

References

External links
 Sidedoor podcast: America's Unknown Celebrity Chef
 Creole Cuisine: Lena Richard

1890s births
1950 deaths
Chefs from New Orleans
African-American chefs
American women chefs
American television chefs
Women cookbook writers
American cookbook writers
African-American Catholics
20th-century African-American women
20th-century African-American people
20th-century American people